The following is a list of the islands of the French territorial collectivity of Saint Pierre and Miquelon.

Saint Pierre and Miquelon was a colony of France. It became a territoire d'outre-mer (overseas territory) in 1946, a département d'outre-mer (overseas department) on 1976-07-19, and then a collectivité territoriale (territorial collectivity) on 1985-06-11. Saint Pierre and Miquelon has a department code of 975, which is an extension of the French system.

Saint Pierre and Miquelon is divided into two communes.
1. Miquelon-Langlade	
2. Saint-Pierre

Islands
Grand Colombier
Pee Pee Island
Île aux Chevaux
Île de Langlade
Le Cap
Île de Miquelon, largest island of Saint Pierre and Miquelon
Île de Saint-Pierre
L'Île-aux-Marins
L'Île-aux-Pigeons
L'Île-aux-Vainqueurs
La Dune

See also

Saint Pierre and Miquelon
Geography of Saint Pierre and Miquelon
List of Saint Pierre and Miquelon-related topics
List of islands by area
List of islands by highest point
List of islands by population

External links

Islands of Saint Pierre and Miquelon @ United Nations Environment Programme

World island information @ WorldIslandInfo.com

 
Islands
Islands
Saint Pierre and Miquelon
Environment of Saint Pierre and Miquelon